André Lima Pedro (born January 17, 1985), sometimes known as just André , is a Brazilian left back. He currently plays for Sertãozinho Futebol Clube.

Honours
Brazilian Cup: 2006
Rio de Janeiro State League: 2007

Contract
1 September 2005 to 31 December 2009

External links 
 CBF
 Guardian Stats Centre
 sambafoot
 zerozero.pt
 globoesporte

1985 births
Living people
Brazilian footballers
Grêmio Barueri Futebol players
CR Flamengo footballers
Fortaleza Esporte Clube players
Oeste Futebol Clube players
People from Osasco
Sport Club Barueri players
Association football defenders
Footballers from São Paulo (state)